The following list of works by German philosopher Georg Wilhelm Friedrich Hegel (1770–1831).

Collected works in German

Standard citation numbers
Hegel is cited—unless otherwise specified—on the basis of his output according w Eva Moldenhauer and Karl Markus Michel, Frankfurt a. M.: Suhrkamp, 1979. Prior to 1979, see below. Additions such as "A" or "B" refer to annotations added to the original text.

Band or the abbreviation Bd. is the German word meaning the volume number of the work.

The "1817 Encyclopaedia" contained only outline notes for students, called Zusatz ("addition").  They are often combined with the three books of Hegel's later work called "System der Philosophie I, II, III," the combinations being called the Encyclopaedia I, II and III.

Werke in 20 Bänden (complete works in 20 volumes), eds., E. Moldenhauer and K. M. Michel (Suhrkamp, 1969–1971).

Other volume numbers exist for the different editions of his complete works that were published at various times over the past two centuries:

Berlin 1832–1845 edition
Vollständige Ausgabe (complete edition)

 Bd. 1 Philosophische Abhandlungen
 Bd. 2 Phänomenologie des Geistes
 Bd. 3–5 Wissenschaft der Logik
 Bd. 6–7 Encyklopädie . . .
 Bd. 8 Grundlinien der Philosophie des Rechts . . .
 Bd. 9 Vorlesungen über die Philosophie der Geschichte
 Bd. 10 Vorlesungen über die Ästhetik
 Bd. 11–12 Vorlesungen über die Philosophie der Religion . .
 Bd. 13–15 Vorlesungen über die Geschichte der Philosophie
 Bd. 16–17 Vermischte Schritten
 Bd. 18 Philosophische Propädeutik
 Erg. Bd. 19 hg. von K. Hegel: Briefe von und an Hegel. Leipzig 1887

Stuttgart 1927–1940 edition 
Sämtliche Werke (complete works), ed., H. Glockner

 Bd. 1 Aufsätze aus dem Kritischen Journal . .
 Bd. 2 Phänomenologie des Geistes
 Bd. 3 Philosophische Propädeutik
 Bd. 4–5 Wissenschaft der Logik
 Bd. 6 Enzyklopädie . . . (1817) u.a. Schriften
 Bd. 7 Grundlinien der Philosophie des Rechts
 Bd. 8–10 System der Philosophie
 Bd. 11 Vorlesungen über die Philosophie der Geschichte
 Bd. 12–14 Vorlesungen über die Ästhetik
 Bd. 15–16 Vorlesungen über die Philosophie der Religion
 Bd. 17–19 Vorlesungen über die Geschichte der Philosophie
 Bd. 20 Vermischte Schriften aus der Berliner Zeit

Leipzig 1911 edition
Sämtliche Werke, eds., Georg Lasson, später J. Hoffmeister.

 Bd.1 Erste Druckschriften. 1928
 Bd.2 Phänomenologie des Geistes. 1921 (1907)
 Bd.3–4 Wissenschaft der Logik. 1923
 Bd.5 Enzyklopädie . . . [1827 u. 1830]. 1920 (1905)
 Bd.6 Grundlinien der Philosophie des Rechts. 1911
 Bd.7 Schriften zur Politik und Rechtsphilosophie. 1913
 Bd.8-9 Philosophie der Weltgeschichte. 1919-1944
 Bd.10(A) Vorlesungen über die Ästhetik. Teilbd. i. 1931
 Bd.12–14 Vorlesungen über die Philosophie der Religion. 1921, 1927
 Bd.15(A) Vorlesungen über die Geschichte der Philosophie. Teilbd. 1 1940
 Bd.18 Jenenser Logik, Metaphysik und Naturphilosophie. 1923
 Bd.19 Jenenser Realphilosophie I. 1932
 Bd.20 Jenenser Realphilosophie II. 1931
 Bd.21 Nürnberger Schritten 1808–1816. 1938

Hamburg, 1968
Gesammelte Werke – Akademie-Ausgabe (Academy edition)

Translations of major works

Tübingen, Berne, Frankfurt period

 Three Essays, 1793-1795: The Tübingen Essay, Berne Fragments, the Life of Jesus (Tübingen, Berne 1793–95), tr. J. Dobbins and P. Fuss, 1984
 Early Theological Writings (Berne, Frankfurt 1795–1800), tr. T.M. Knox 1948, reprinted 1971

Jena period
 The Difference Between Fichte's and Schelling's Systems of Philosophy (the 'Differenzschrift') (Jena 1801), tr. H.S. Harris and W. Cerf 1977. 
 Available online: German text
 Natural Law (Jena, 1802), tr. T.M. Knox 1975
 Faith and Knowledge (Jena, 1802), tr. W. Cerf and H.S. Harris 1977
 System of Ethical Life and First Philosophy of Spirit (Jena, 1802, 1803–4), tr. H.S. Harris and T.M. Knox 1979. 
 Available online: System of Ethical Life
 The Jena System 1804-5: Logic and Metaphysics (Jena, 1804–5), tr. J. Burbidge and G. di Giovanni 1986. Second Jena system
 Hegel and the Human Spirit (Jena, 1805–6), tr. L. Rauch 1983. Third Jena system. 
Available online: English text (in part)
 Phenomenology of Spirit (Jena, 1807), tr. A.V. Miller 1977, 
 Looser but more readable translation, as The Phenomenology of Mind, tr. J.B. Baillie 1910, revised 1931. 
 Available online: German text, German text on a single page, Baillie translation, Baillie translation
 The Phenomenology of Spirit (Cambridge Hegel Translations), translated by Terry Pinkard (Cambridge University Press, 2018) 
 The Phenomenology of Spirit: Translated with Introduction and Commentary, translated by Michael Inwood (Oxford University Press, 2018) 
 Spirit: Book Six of Hegel's Phenomenology of Spirit, (ed.) D.E. Shannon, 2001

Nürnberg period
 The Philosophical Propaedeutic (Nürnberg, 1808–11), tr. A.V. Miller, 1986. 
Available online: Section on Phenomenology, Section on Logic
 Science of Logic (Nürnberg, 1812–16, rev. Berlin 1831), 
 tr. A.V. Miller 1969 pb
 2 volumes, tr. W.H. Johnston and L.G. Struthers 1929. 
 Available online: German text part 1, part 2, Miller translation (extracts)

Heidelberg period
 Encyclopaedia of the Philosophical Sciences in Outline (Heidelberg 1817), tr. S.H. Taubeneck 1990.
 This includes the Encyclopaedia Logic, Philosophy of Nature and Philosophy of Mind
 Encyclopaedia Logic (also known as Shorter Logic) (Heidelberg, 1817, rev. Berlin 1827, 1830), tr. T.F. Geraets et al. 1991 pb, 
or in a much worse translation, as Hegel's Logic or The Logic of Hegel, tr. W. Wallace 1873, reprinted 1975, 
Available online: German text, Wallace translation
 Encyclopaedia Philosophy of Nature (Heidelberg, 1817, rev. Berlin, 1827, 1830) 
 as The Philosophy of Nature, tr. A.V. Miller 1970, 
 In a better translation with a plethora of explanatory notes, in 3 volumes, tr. M.J. Petry 1970
 Available online: German text, Taubeneck translation of 1817 edition
 Encyclopaedia Philosophy of Spirit (Heidelberg, 1817, rev. Berlin, 1827, 1830) 
 as Hegel's Philosophy of Mind, tr. W. Wallace 1894, republished with additions, tr. A.V. Miller 1971 pb. 
 With the German on opposite pages and an 1825 set of students lecture notes as an appendix, as Hegel's Philosophy of Subjective Spirit, 3 volumes, tr. M.J. Petry 1978. 
 Petry republished the section on Phenomenology, with the 1825 lecture notes interpolated between the paragraphs of Hegel's text instead of the usual additions, as The Berlin Phenomenology 1981
 Available online: German text, Wallace translation
 Lectures on Natural Right and Political Science (Heidelberg, 1817–18), tr. J.M. Stewart and P.C. Hodgson 1995

Berlin period
 Philosophy of Right (Berlin, 1821) 
Elements of the Philosophy of Right, tr. H.B. Nisbet 1991 pb, preferable to the older translations 
Hegel's Philosophy of Right, tr. T. Knox 1952 pb, and, tr. Dyde 1897. Available online
 Lectures on the Philosophy of History (Berlin, 1820s) as 
The Philosophy of History, tr. J. Sibree 1858, revised 1899, reprinted 1956 pb. 
The introduction is published separately, in much better translations than Sibree's, 
Reason in History, tr. R.S. Hartman 1953, 
Introduction to the Philosophy of History, tr. L. Rauch 1988 pb;  
Lectures on the Philosophy of World History, Introduction: Reason in History, tr. H.B. Nisbet 1975 pb. More complete version of introduction. Available online: Sibree translation of introduction. 
A new translation is now available: Lectures on the Philosophy of History, trans. Ruben Alvarado.
 Lectures on Aesthetics (Berlin, 1820s), as 
 Hegel's Aesthetics, 2 volumes, tr. T.M. Knox 1979. 
 The introduction is published separately as Introductory Lectures on Aesthetics, tr. B. Bosanquet 1886, reissued 1993 pb, and also as 
 Hegel's Introduction to Aesthetics, tr. T.M. Knox 9179. 
 Available online: Knox translation of whole text
 Lectures on the Philosophy of Religion (Berlin, 1821–31), 3 volumes, tr. P.C. Hodgson et al. 1984–87. 
Preferable to the older version, tr. E.B. Speirs and J.B. Sanderson 1895, reprinted 1968. 
Available online: Speirs and Sanderson translation (introduction)
 Lectures on the Philosophy of Religion: One-volume Edition, The Lectures of 1827 (Berlin, 1827), tr. P.C. Hodgson et al. 1988. 
The 1827 version of the lectures extracted from the 3-volume edition
 Lectures on the Proofs of the Existence of God, tr. P.C. Hodgson 2007
 Lectures on the History of Philosophy (Berlin, 1820s), 3 volumes, tr. E. S. Haldane and F. Simson 1892–96, reprinted 1995 pb. 
A more accurate version of volume 3 is published as Lectures on the History of Philosophy: The Lectures of 1825-26. 
Volume 3: Medieval and Modern Philosophy, tr. R. F. Brown and J. M. Stewart 1990. 
The various introductions are translated separately as Introduction to the Lectures on the History of Philosophy, tr. T.M. Knox and A.V. Miller 1985 pb. 
Available online: Haldane and Simson translation (selections)

Other
 Hegel: The Letters, tr. C. Butler and C. Seiler 1984
 Oldest Systematic Program of German Idealism. Scholars claimed the author is Hegel. The manuscript is clearly handwritten by Hegel around 1796.  Some scholars have dated earlier or later by a few years. The actual text is about 700 words; not dated nor signed. Note: authorship of this text is highly debated.  The text is include in the published collected writings of Hegel, Schelling, and F. Hölderlin.  In German, see Frank-Peter Hansen. Das älteste Systemprogramm des deutschen Idealismus. Rezeptionsgeschichte und Interpretation.  1989, 2014. . Berlin New York: Walter de Gruyter. Pages 1–514.   In English, see Oldest Systematic Program of German Idealism: Translation and Notes by Daniel Fidel Ferrer. 2021. Pages 1–123.  A very detailed discussion and analysis of the handwritten manuscript, see Das Älteste Systemprogramm des deutschen Idealismus - neue Transkription  by Christoph v. Wolzogen.
 Political Writings, edited by Laurence Dickey, Professor of History, University of Wisconsin-Madison and H B Nisbet, Professor of Modern Languages, University of Cambridge, and Fellow of Sidney Sussex College. Translated: by H B Nisbet, Cambridge University Press.
 The German Constitution (Die Verfassung Deutschlands)

Translations of minor works

Jena period
Two fragments of 1797 on love (1797), Clio 8 (2), 1979
Two fragments on the ideal of social life (1799–1800), Clio 10 (4), 1981
The relationship of skepticism to philosophy (1801), in G. di Giovanni and H.S. Harris, tr. Between Kant and Hegel: Texts in the Development of Post-Kantian Idealism, 1985
On the nature of philosophical critique (1802), partly translated in M.N. Forster, Hegel's Idea of a Phenomenology of Spirit, 1998, pp. 605–607
Aphorisms from the wastebook (1803–1806), Independent Journal of Philosophy 3, 1979
Who thinks abstractly? (1807–1808), in Walter Kaufmann's Hegel: Reinterpretation, Texts and Commentary, pp. 461–465. Available online: German text, English text

Berlin period
Reason and religious truth (1821), foreword to H. Hinrich's Religion in its Inner Relation to Science, in F. Weiss (ed.) Beyond Epistemology: New Studies in the Philosophy of Hegel, pp. 227–244. Available online: German text
Miscellaneous Writings of G.W.F. Hegel, (ed.) J. Stewart (2000)

Untranslated or only recently translated
A number of student lecture notes from Hegel's classes remain untranslated:
VPR: Vorlesungen über Rechtsphilosophie (Lectures on the Philosophy of Right) Edited by K.-H. Ilting. Stuttgart: Frommann Verlag, 1974. 4 volumes; cited by volume and page number.
VPR17: Die Philosophie des Rechts: Die Mitschriften Wannenmann (Heidelberg 1817–1818) und Homeyer (Berlin 1818–1819). Edited by K.-H. Ilting. Stuttgart: Klett-Cotta Verlag, 1983.
VPR19: Philosophie des Rechts: Die Vorlesung von 1819/1820. Edited by Dieter Henrich. Frankfurt: Suhrkamp Verlag, 1983.
Carovés Hegel-Mitschriften (Heidelberg 1816-1818). Planned edition by Klaus Vieweg, Christian Illies and Marko Fuchs.

References

External links
 Ausgaben von Hegels Werken – Hegel.net 

 
Bibliographies by writer
Bibliographies of German writers
Philosophy bibliographies